Racing Blood is a 1936 American crime film directed by Victor Halperin and written by Joseph O'Donnell. The film stars Frankie Darro, Kane Richmond, Gladys Blake, Arthur Housman, James Eagles, Matthew Betz, Si Wills and Fred Toones. The film was released on November 15, 1936, by Conn Pictures Corporation.

Plot

Cast          
Frankie Darro as Frankie Reynolds
Kane Richmond as Clay Harrison
Gladys Blake as Phyllis Reynolds
Arthur Housman as Legs
James Eagles as Smokey Reynolds 
Matthew Betz as Tex O'Donnell 
Si Wills as Dopey
Fred Toones as Sad Sam 
Bob Tansill as Magnus

References

External links
 

1936 films
American crime films
1936 crime films
Films directed by Victor Halperin
American black-and-white films
1930s English-language films
1930s American films
English-language crime films